The 2018 Pennsylvania state elections took place on November 6, 2018. On that date, the Commonwealth of Pennsylvania held elections for the following offices: Governor and Lieutenant Governor (on one ticket), U.S. Senate, U.S. House of Representatives, Pennsylvania State Senate, Pennsylvania House of Representatives, and various others. Primary elections took place on May 15, 2018.

On Election Day, Democratic Gov. Tom Wolf was re-elected with new Lt. Gov. John Fetterman, as was incumbent Democratic U.S. Senator Bob Casey Jr. Democrats gained five seats in Pennsylvania's congressional delegation, bringing the delegation to a 9-9 split. Democrats also broke a Republican supermajority in the Pennsylvania State Senate by gaining five seats, and gained eleven seats in the Pennsylvania House of Representatives.

United States Senate 

Incumbent Democratic Senator Bob Casey Jr. sought reelection against Republican Congressman Lou Barletta in the general election. He won with 56% of the vote.

United States House of Representatives

Redistricting 

In January 2018, the Pennsylvania Supreme Court struck down the state's congressional map, ruling it had been unfairly gerrymandered to favor Republicans. New maps were subsequently adopted in February 2018, for use in 2018's elections and taking effect with representation in 2019.

Special Elections

18th Congressional District 

A special election for Pennsylvania's 18th congressional district was held on March 13, 2018, following the resignation of Republican Rep. Tim Murphy.

7th and 15th Congressional Districts 

Along with the general election, special elections were also held on November 6 following the resignations of Republican Reps. Pat Meehan (PA-7) and Charlie Dent (PA-15).

General Election 
Voters in Pennsylvania elected 18 candidates to serve in the U.S. House, one from each of the 18 congressional districts.

Governor & Lt. Governor 

One-term Governor Tom Wolf and Lt. Governor Mike Stack were both eligible for re-election. Stack was defeated in his primary by Braddock mayor John Fetterman. Wolf and Fetterman went on to defeat the Republican ticket of State Senator Scott Wagner and businessman Jeff Bartos.

Pennsylvania Senate 

25 of 50 seats (even-numbered districts) in the Pennsylvania Senate were up for election in Pennsylvania's general election.

Pennsylvania House of Representatives

Special elections 
Special elections were held for the 35th, 48th, 68th, and 178th districts prior to the general election.

General election 
All 203 seats in the Pennsylvania House of Representatives were up for election in the general election.

Pennsylvania ballot measures 
There were no statewide ballot measures up for election in this general election; however, there were local ballot measures in Allengeny and Philadelphia Counties.

See also 

 Elections in Pennsylvania
 Electoral reform in Pennsylvania
 Bilingual elections requirement for Pennsylvania (per Voting Rights Act Amendments of 2006)
 Political party strength in Pennsylvania
 Politics of Pennsylvania

References 

November 2018 events in the United States